So80s presents Alphaville is a compilation album for the band Alphaville, released in October 2014. The release includes all of their original 12-inch 1980's maxi-singles and their respective B-sides, many for the first time on CD in their original form.

Background
This 2-CD collection includes all original 1980's 12" singles starting with "Big in Japan" (1984) through "Mysteries of Love" (1989). Also included are the original B-sides and select alternate mixes, including original instrumental and dub mixes. One original mix (Torsten Fenslau's remix of "Big in Japan") is also included. The tracks were remastered from the original master tapes, and initial copies were signed by the band.

Track listing

Critical reception

The album has been favorably reviewed, and entered the German charts at #26.

Notes

2014 compilation albums
Alphaville (band) albums